Ileana Silai (née Gergely on 14 October 1941) is a retired Romanian middle-distance runner. She competed in the 800 m at the 1968, 1972 and 1976 Olympics and in the 1500 m at the 1976 and 1980 Olympics. She won a silver over 800 m in 1968. At the European indoor championships she won silver medals in the 800 metres in 1971 and 1972 and a gold in the 1500 m in 1978.

Biography
Silai took up athletics in 1957, following her brother, and first trained in sprint and long jump. She then married and had a break from athletics until 1963. After retiring she moved to Munich, Germany, where her husband worked as an architect and she trained children. Since 1991 she has not been involved with sport.

Doping
In 1979 Silai was banned for 18 months for taking anabolic steroids. After 8 months she was reinstated after IAAF President Adriaan Paulen of the Netherlands said that an 18-month suspension in the steroid case would have kept the women out of the Moscow Olympics, which would have constituted "an extra penalty." He said that the IAAF Council had therefore reinstated them for "humane reasons."

References 

1941 births
Living people
Sportspeople from Cluj-Napoca
Romanian female middle-distance runners
Olympic athletes of Romania
Athletes (track and field) at the 1968 Summer Olympics
Athletes (track and field) at the 1972 Summer Olympics
Athletes (track and field) at the 1976 Summer Olympics
Athletes (track and field) at the 1980 Summer Olympics
Olympic silver medalists for Romania
Doping cases in athletics
Romanian sportspeople in doping cases
Medalists at the 1968 Summer Olympics
Olympic silver medalists in athletics (track and field)